Isolobodon is an extinct genus of rodent in the subfamily Capromyinae. 
It contains the following species:
 Montane hutia (Isolobodon montanus)
 Puerto Rican hutia (Isolobodon portoricensis)

 
Hutias
Rodent genera
Taxa named by Joel Asaph Allen
Holocene extinctions
Extinct rodents
Taxonomy articles created by Polbot